The 2006 J. League Division 2 season is the 35th season of the second-tier club football in Japan and the 8th season since the establishment of J2 League.

In this season, number of participating clubs became thirteen, increased by one from the previous season. The clubs competed in the quadruple round-robin format for the top two promotion slots. Farther, the third-placed finisher participated in the Pro/Rele Series for the promotion.  There were no relegation to the third-tier Japan Football League.

General

Promotion and relegation 
 At the end of the 2005 season, Kyoto Purple Sanga, Avispa Fukuoka, and Ventforet Kofu were promoted to J1
 At the end of the 2005 season,  Kashiwa Reysol, Tokyo Verdy 1969, and Vissel Kobe were relegated to J2.
 At the end of the 2005 season,  Ehime FC was promoted to J2.

Changes in competition format 
 Number of participating club increased to 13 games
 Each clubs will play 48 games instead 44 games

Changes in clubs
none

Clubs

Following thirteen clubs played in J. League Division 2 during 2006 season. Of these clubs, Kashiwa Reysol, Tokyo Verdy 1969, and Vissel Kobe relegated from J1 last year. Also, Ehime F.C. newly joined the J. League Division 2 from Japan Football League.

 Consadole Sapporo
 Vegalta Sendai
 Montedio Yamagata
 Mito HollyHocks
 Thespa Kusatsu
 Kashiwa Reysol 
 Tokyo Verdy 1969 
 Yokohama F.C.
 Shonan Bellmare
 Vissel Kobe 
 Tokushima Vortis
 Ehime F.C. 
 Sagan Tosu

League format
Thirteen clubs will play in quadruple round-robin format, a total of 48 games each. A club receives 3 points for a win, 1 point for a tie, and 0 points for a loss. The clubs are ranked by points, and tie breakers are, in the following order:
 Goal differential
 Goals scored
 Head-to-head results
A draw would be conducted, if necessary.  However, if two clubs are tied at the first place, both clubs will be declared as the champions. The top two clubs will be promoted to J1, while the 3rd placed club plays a two-legged Promotion/relegation series.
Changes from Previous Year
 Number of clubs increased from 12 (2001–2005) to 13 (2006–2007)
 Number of games per club increased from 44 games (2001–2005) to 48 games (2006–2007)

Final league table

Final results

Top scorers

Attendance

References

J2 League seasons
2
Japan
Japan